In Blue is the thirty-first album by Klaus Schulze. It was originally released in 1995, and in 2005 was the eighth Schulze album reissued by Revisited Records. In Blue was released after Schulze's Silver Edition 10-disc CD box set, technically making this album his forty-first.

Track listing
All tracks composed by Klaus Schulze.

Disc 1

Disc 2

Disc 3

References

External links
 In Blue at the official site of Klaus Schulze
 

Klaus Schulze albums
1995 albums